Bath is an unincorporated community and census-designated place in Brown County, South Dakota, United States. As of the 2020 census, Bath had a population of 142. Bath has been assigned the ZIP code of 57427.

Demographics

History
A post office called Bath was established in 1881. The community's name is derived from Bath, England.

References

Census-designated places in South Dakota
Unincorporated communities in Brown County, South Dakota
Unincorporated communities in South Dakota
Aberdeen, South Dakota micropolitan area